One Post Street is a 38-story,  office skyscraper located at 1 Post Street and Market Street in the Financial District of San Francisco, California, United States.  The building is owned by Brookfield Properties. It served as headquarters for the McKesson Corporation until April 2019.

Designed by architect Welton Becket, the building exemplified his penchant for repetitive geometric patterns and walls clad in natural stone. Landscape architect SWA Group's design for the busy triangular/flatiron site created an octagonal, two-tiered opening leading to a Bay Area Rapid Transit station, and flanked by trees, shops and a series of granite steps used for seating.

In the soap opera The Young and the Restless, the building is featured as "Lakeview Towers", where numerous characters — beginning in 2012 with Victor Newman — have lived in either of two adjoining penthouse apartments.

See also
 List of tallest buildings in San Francisco

References

Skyscraper office buildings in San Francisco
Financial District, San Francisco
Welton Becket buildings
Office buildings completed in 1969